Hanö is an island off Listerlandet peninsula, western Blekinge, Sweden.
From 1810 to 1812, during the Napoleonic Wars the Royal Navy of the United Kingdom used the island as its base during its operations in the Baltic Sea. The "English cemetery" is situated on the island, and still today British warships visit the island to pay tribute to the fifteen sailors who rest there.  constructed a big wooden cross on the spot of the graveyard which is visible several miles out to sea.

Climate
Hanö has an oceanic climate typical of southern Sweden, but with a narrower temperature range than the interior of Blekinge due to its exposed position to maritime winds.

References

External links
Hanö at Sölvesborg Municipality 

Swedish islands in the Baltic
Islands of Blekinge County